The olfactory trigone is a small triangular area in front of the anterior perforated substance.

Its apex, directed forward, occupies the posterior part of the olfactory sulcus, and is brought into view by throwing back the olfactory tract.

It is part of the olfactory pathway.

References

Olfactory system